Switzerland competed at the 1988 Winter Paralympics in Innsbruck, Austria. 32 competitors from Switzerland won 23 medals including 8 gold, 7 silver and 8 bronze and finished 5th in the medal table.

Alpine skiing 

The medalists are:

  Fritz Berger Men's Downhill LW2
  Paul Fournier Men's Downhill LW4
  Paul Fournier Men's Slalom LW4
  Francoise Jacquerod Women's Giant Slalom LW10
  Francoise Jacquerod Women's Slalom LW10
  Jacques Blanc Men's Giant Slalom LW10
  Jacques Blanc Men's Slalom LW10
  Hans Burn Men's Downhill LW4
  Paul Neukomm Men's Downhill LW6/8
  Beatrice Berthet Women's Giant Slalom LW4
  Beatrice Berthet Women's Slalom LW4
  Hans Burn Men's Giant Slalom LW4
  Hermann Kollau Men's Giant Slalom LW10
  Paul Neukomm Men's Giant Slalom LW6/8

Biathlon 

The medalists are:

  Christoph Andres Men's 7.5 km LW2

Cross-country 

The medalists are:

  Christoph Andres Men's Long Distance 10 km LW2
  Christoph Andres Men's Short Distance 5 km LW2
  Heinz Frei Men's Short Distance 5 km grade I
  Walter Baertschi, Heinz Frei, Walter Widmer Men's 3x2.5 km Relay grade I-II
  Walter Widmer Men's Long Distance 10 km grade II
  Heinz Frei Men's Long Distance 10 km grade I
  Monika Waelti Women's Long Distance 10 km LW3/4/9
  Monika Waelti Women's Short Distance 5 km LW3/4/9

See also 

 Switzerland at the Paralympics
 Switzerland at the 1988 Winter Olympics

References 

1988
1988 in Swiss sport
Nations at the 1988 Winter Paralympics